The 111th Virginia General Assembly was the meeting of the legislative branch of the Virginia state government from 1920 to 1922, after the 1919 state elections. It convened in Richmond for one session.

Background

Senate

Leadership

Members

House of Delegates

Leadership

See also
 List of Virginia state legislatures

References

Government of Virginia
Virginia legislative sessions
1920 in Virginia
1920 U.S. legislative sessions